James C. Nicola is an American theatre director. From 1988 to 2022 he was the artistic director of the New York Theatre Workshop. Nicola was awarded a Special Tony Award at the 75th Tony Awards.

References 

Living people
Place of birth missing (living people)
Year of birth missing (living people)
American theatre directors
Artistic directors
Special Tony Award recipients